Many aircraft types have served in the Royal Australian Air Force (RAAF) since it was formed in March 1921. This is a list of RAAF aircraft, those types that have served and been retired by the RAAF. It also includes aircraft of the Australian Flying Corps, Australian Air Corps and Australian Air Force.  The aircraft are listed in alphabetic order of their RAAF type name, and then in mark order within that type. For the current aircraft of the RAAF, refer to the list of current Royal Australian Air Force aircraft.

By type

|-
|Avro 504
|United Kingdom
|biplane
|trainer
|1916
|
|132
|several variants used, including at least 8 504A, 7 504J, and 56 504K
|-
|B.E.2a
|United Kingdom
|biplane
|trainer
|1914
|1918
|2
|operated by Central Flying School as CFS1 and CFS2
|-
|B.E.2c
|United Kingdom
|biplane
|reconnaissance
|
|
|27
|operated by No. 1 Sqn.
|-
|B.E.2e
|United Kingdom
|biplane
|trainer
|
|1920
|1
|operated by 1, 4, and 7 Sqns.; 1 operated by Central Flying School from 1918 to 1920
|-
|Blériot XI
|France
|prop
|trainer
|1915
|1917
|1
|operated by Central Flying School as CFS6; primarily for ground instruction
|-
|Boxkite
|United Kingdom
|prop
|trainer
|1913
|1917
|2
|one built by Bristol and second ordered but not delivered; another was built in Australia from parts; operated by Central Flying School as CFS3 and CFS8; first military aircraft built in Australia
|-
|Boxkite XV
|United Kingdom
|prop
|trainer
|1916
|1918
|2
|built by Grahame-White Aviation Company; operated by Central Flying School
|-
|CA-25 Winjeel
|Australia
|prop
|trainer
|1955
|1995
|62 Production + 2 Prototypes
|Served as a Central Flying School trainer and then into a FAC (Forward Air Control) role in its final years, replaced by the PAC CT-4A
|-
|PAC CT/4 Airtrainer
|New Zealand
|prop
|trainer
|1975
|1992
|51
|Served as a Central Flying School trainer, Became replaced by contracted BAE Systems CT-4B's, until BAE contract was lost. Civilian use of CT-4As are high.
|-
|CA-26 Sabre
|Australia
|jet
|fighter
|1956
|1957
|1
|Experimental development of the F-86 Sabre, led to CA-27 Sabre
|-
|CA-27 Sabre Mk.30-32
|Australia
|jet
|fighter
|1956
|1971
|112
|license-built by Commonwealth Aircraft Corporation; replaced by the Mirage III
|-
|Caudron G.III
|France
|biplane
|trainer
|1916
|1917
|1
|operated by Central Flying School
|-
|Deperdussin Type A
|France
|prop
|trainer
|1913
|1918
|2
|built by British Deperdussin; operated by Central Flying School as CFS4 and CFS5
|-
|DH.1a
|United Kingdom
|biplane
|fighter
|1916
|1916
|1
|built by Savages; operated by 1 Sqn AFC; returned to UK
|-
|DH.5
|United Kingdom
|biplane
|fighter
|1917
|
|78
|operated by 2 & 6 Sqns AFC
|-
|DH.6
|United Kingdom
|biplane
|trainer
|1918
|1919
|28
|2 additional aircraft ordered by Central Flying School but lost at sea during delivery; operated by 5, 7, and 8 Sqns RFC
|-
|DH.9A
|United Kingdom
|biplane
|light bomber
|1920
|1930
|31
|30 acquired as an imperial gift from the United Kingdom1 replacement purchased6 destroyed; 16 scrapped; 9 written-offassigned RAAF serial prefix A1
|-
|DHC-4 Caribou
|Canada
|prop
|airlift
|1964
|2009
|
|Operated as transport aircraft and STOL Aircraft throughout the Vietnam war and PNG regions
|-
|F.2b Fighter
|United Kingdom
|biplane
|fighter
|1918
|1919
|67
|operated by 1, 3, and 7 Sqns. AFC
|-
|F-111C Aardvark
|United States
|jet
|medium-range interdictor/ Tactical Strike
|1973
|2010
|24
||Ordered in 1963 to replace the ageing English Electric Canberra Bombers. Delivery not received until 1973, RAAF used leased F-4 Phantoms while the U.S. produced the first F-111Cs
|-
|width=150|F-111G Aardvark
|width=130|United States
|jet
|medium-range interdictor/ Tactical Strike
|1992
|2007
|15
|former USAF aircraft, attrition replacements for the F-111C
|-
|F.E.2b
|United Kingdom
|biplane
|trainer
|1917
|1920
|1
|operated by Central Flying School
|-
|F.K.3
|United Kingdom
|biplane
|trainer
|1917
|1917
|4
|briefly operated by the AFC
|-
|Lincoln Mk.30
|United Kingdom
|prop
|bomber
|1946
|1961
| 
| 
|-
|Lincoln Mk.31
|United Kingdom
|prop
|LRN (long Range Navigation Bomber)
|1946
|1961
|
|"Long Nose" Lincoln was unique to Australian service, featuring a 6' 6" nose extension
|-
|Maurice Farman Hydro-Aeroplane
|France
|floatplane
|trainer
|1914
|1917
|1
|operated by Central Flying School as CFS7
|-
|M.F.7 Longhorn
|France
|biplane
|trainer
|1916
|1918
|1
|operated by Central Flying School as CFS15
|-
|M.F.11 Shorthorn
|France
|biplane
|trainer
|1916
|1919
|5
|operated by Central Flying School
|-
|Mirage IIIO(A & F)
|France Australia
|jet
|interceptor
|1964
|1988
|100
|built by Government Aircraft Factories; replaced by the AF-18A Hornet
|-
|Mirage III D
|France Australia
|jet
|operational trainer
|1964
|1988
|16
|built by Government Aircraft Factories; replaced by the AF-18B Hornet
|-
|Scout D
|United Kingdom
|biplane
|utility
|1916
|1926
|1
|operated by Central Flying School and No. 1 Flying Training School RAAF
|-
|UH-1B Iroquois
|United States
|helicopter
|utility transport
|1966
|1989
|
|replaced by the S-70 Black Hawk
|-
|UH-1D Iroquois
|United States
|helicopter
|utility transport
|
|1989
|
|replaced by the S-70 Black Hawk
|-
|UH-1H Iroquois
|United States
|helicopter
|utility transport
|
|1989
|
|replaced by the S-70 Black Hawk
|-
|}

Australian Central Flying School 1913-1919

Australian Flying Corps 1913–1920

Australian Air Corps 1920-1921

Fighters and fighter-bombers

Bombers

Maritime Reconnaissance

Army Cooperation

Trainers

Australian Defence Force Basic Flying Training School 1993-2019

Helicopters

Reconnaissance and intelligence

Liaison/Communications

Transport and utility

Prototypes

Civilian aircraft operating under contract

Hot air balloons

Captured enemy aircraft

World War I

World War II

Drones/RAV

List of weapons of the Royal Australian Air Force

Guided Missiles

Unguided rockets

Free fall bombs

Machine-guns

See also

List of current Royal Australian Air Force aircraft
List of General Dynamics F-111 aircraft operated by the Royal Australian Air Force

Notes

Bibliography

External links 
 

Royal Australian Air Force lists
Australia
Aircraft in Royal Australian Air Force service